Indian reserves for First Nations in Alberta were established by a series of treaties — Treaty 6, Treaty 7, and Treaty 8.

However, according to Indigenous and Northern Affairs Canada reserves in Alberta total . Indigenous and Northern Affairs Canada and Statistics Canada recognize six Indian settlements within Alberta.

List of reserves in Alberta

Indian settlements

See also 
First Nations in Alberta
List of Indian reserves in Canada
List of communities in Alberta
List of municipalities in Alberta
Métis in Alberta

References

External links 
Alberta Government - Aboriginal Relations
Alberta Government - Map of reserves and settlements

 
Indian, Alberta
Indian Reserves